Philip O'Donoghue (1896–1987) was an Irish jurist who served on the European Commission of Human Rights (1965–1971) and European Court of Human Rights (1971–1980). He also was a member of the Irish Commission on the Status of Women in 1970.

References

Judges of the European Court of Human Rights
20th-century Irish judges
1896 births
1987 deaths
Members of the European Commission of Human Rights
Irish judges of international courts and tribunals